Papahagi is an Aromanian surname that may refer to:

 Adrian Papahagi (born 1976), Romanian philologist, essayist and politician
  (1948–1999), linguist, literary critic, essayist and translator
 Pericle Papahagi (1872–1943), Ottoman-born Romanian literary historian and folklorist
 Tache Papahagi (1892–1977), Ottoman-born Romanian folklorist and linguist

Aromanian-language surnames